Double-stranded uracil-DNA glycosylase (Mug, double-strand uracil-DNA glycosylase, Dug, dsUDG, double-stranded DNA specific UDG, dsDNA specific UDG, UdgB, G:T/U mismatch-specific DNA glycosylase, UDG) is an enzyme with systematic name uracil-double-stranded DNA deoxyribohydrolase (uracil-releasing). This enzyme catalyses a specific chemical reaction: it hydrolyses mismatched double-stranded DNA and polynucleotides, releasing free uracil.

This enzyme is not active on DNA containing a T/G mispair or single-stranded DNA.

References

External links 
 

EC 3.2.2